The 1994–95 MetJHL season is the 4th season of the Metro Junior A Hockey League (MetJHL). The 14 teams of the Eastern and Western Divisions competed in a 50-game schedule.  The top 4 teams in each division made the playoffs.

The winner of the MetJHL playoffs, the Caledon Canadians, failed to win the 1995 Buckland Cup as Ontario Hockey Association champions or Dudley Hewitt Cup as Central Canadian champions.

Changes
None of note.

Final standings
Note: GP = Games played; W = Wins; L = Losses; OTL = Overtime losses; SL = Shootout losses; GF = Goals for; GA = Goals against; PTS = Points; x = clinched playoff berth; y = clinched division title; z = clinched conference title

1994-95 MetJHL Playoffs

Quarter-final
Thornhill Islanders defeated Kingston Voyageurs 4-games-to-none
Wexford Raiders defeated Wellington Dukes 4-games-to-2
Caledon Canadians defeated Mississauga Chargers 4-games-to-none
St. Michael's Buzzers defeated Aurora Eagles 4-games-to-2
Semi-final
Wexford Raiders defeated Thornhill Islanders 4-games-to-3
Caledon Canadians defeated St. Michael's Buzzers 4-games-to-none
Final
Caledon Canadians defeated Wexford Raiders 4-games-to-none

1995 Dudley Hewitt Cup and Buckland Cup Championships
Event was hosted by the Thunder Bay Flyers in Thunder Bay, Ontario.  The Caledon Canadians finished in third by losing the semi-final.

Round Robin
Brampton Capitals (OPJHL) defeated Caledon Canadians 4-1
Thunder Bay Flyers (USHL) defeated Caledon Canadians 6-3
Caledon Canadians defeated Timmins Golden Bears 7-5

Semi-final
Thunder Bay Flyers (USHL) defeated Caledon Canadians 7-1

See also
 1995 Centennial Cup
 Dudley Hewitt Cup
 List of Ontario Hockey Association Junior A seasons
 Ontario Junior A Hockey League
 Northern Ontario Junior Hockey League
 1994 in ice hockey
 1995 in ice hockey

References

External links
 Official website of the Ontario Junior Hockey League
 Official website of the Canadian Junior Hockey League

Metro Junior A Hockey League seasons
MetJHL